Tomáš Kůrka (born 14 December 1981) is a Czech former ice hockey forward. He played 17 games in the National Hockey League with the Carolina Hurricanes between 2003 and 2004. The rest of his career, which lasted from 1998 to 2020, was mainly spent in the Czech Extraliga.

Playing career
Kůrka was drafted by the Carolina Hurricanes as their second-round pick, No. 32 overall, in the 2000 NHL Entry Draft. Kůrka spent two seasons playing junior level in the Ontario Hockey League with the Plymouth Whalers before moving to the Hurricanes organization in 2001.

After spending a season in the American Hockey League with the Lowell Lock Monsters, Kůrka made his NHL debut with the Hurricanes during 2002–03 NHL season, playing 14 games, scoring 3 goals and 2 assists for 5 points.  He would go on to play just 3 more games for Carolina, scoring no points.  With the 2004–05 NHL season locked-out and eventually cancelled, Kůrka split the season in the AHL with the Providence Bruins and back home in the Czech Republic for HC Litvínov.

He chose to remain in Europe, signing for KalPa in the Finnish SM-liiga.  He also played for Ilves in the same league, before moving to Södertälje SK in the Swedish HockeyAllsvenskan.

Kůrka then returned to the Czech Extraliga in 2007, signing for HC České Budějovice. He joined Slavia Prague for a second time in 2011.

On 8 November 2013, Tomas Kůrka was announced as a Cardiff Devils player, he will play his first game for the Devils on Sunday 10 November 2013 against the Hull Stingrays. He scored a Penalty Shot on his full debut.

Career statistics

Regular season and playoffs

International

References

External links
 

1981 births
Cardiff Devils players
Carolina Hurricanes draft picks
Carolina Hurricanes players
Czech ice hockey left wingers
HC Dynamo Pardubice players
HC Litvínov players
HC Oceláři Třinec players
HC Shakhtyor Soligorsk players
HC Slavia Praha players
HC Sparta Praha players
Ilves players
KalPa players
Living people
Lowell Lock Monsters players
Motor České Budějovice players
Plymouth Whalers players
Providence Bruins players
Rostock Piranhas players
SCL Tigers players
Södertälje SK players
Sportspeople from Most (city)
Sputnik Nizhny Tagil players
Czech expatriate ice hockey players in the United States
Czech expatriate ice hockey players in Finland
Czech expatriate ice hockey players in Sweden
Czech expatriate ice hockey players in Russia
Expatriate ice hockey players in Belarus
Expatriate ice hockey players in Wales
Czech expatriate sportspeople in Wales
Czech expatriate ice hockey players in Switzerland
Czech expatriate ice hockey players in Germany
Czech expatriate sportspeople in Belarus